The Ichthyophiidae are the family of Asiatic tailed caecilians or fish caecilians found in South and Southeast Asia as well as southernmost China.

They are primitive caecilians, lacking many of the derived characters found in the other families. For example, their mouths are not recessed underneath their heads, they possess tails, and they have numerous scales on their bodies. However, they have two sets of muscles for closing the jaw, a feature unique to caecilians, but absent in the related family Rhinatrematidae.

They lay their eggs in cavities in moist soil, where they hatch into larvae that seek out streams or underground seepages, before metamorphosing into adults. Some evidence indicates the females may protect their eggs until they hatch.

Taxonomy
Family Ichthyophiidae

 Genus Ichthyophis
Ichthyophis acuminatus
Ichthyophis alfredi
Ichthyophis asplenius
Ichthyophis atricollaris
Ichthyophis bannanicus
Ichthyophis beddomei
Ichthyophis bernisi
Ichthyophis biangularis
Ichthyophis billitonensis
Ichthyophis bombayensis
Ichthyophis cardamomensis
Ichthyophis catlocensis
Ichthyophis chaloensis
Ichthyophis daribokensis
Ichthyophis davidi
Ichthyophis dulitensis
Ichthyophis elongatus
Ichthyophis garoensis
Ichthyophis glandulosus
Ichthyophis glutinosus
Ichthyophis humphreyi
Ichthyophis hypocyaneus
Ichthyophis javanicus
Ichthyophis khumhzi
Ichthyophis kodaguensis
Ichthyophis kohtaoensis
Ichthyophis lakimi
Ichthyophis laosensis
Ichthyophis larutensis
Ichthyophis longicephalus
Ichthyophis mindanaoensis
Ichthyophis monochrous
Ichthyophis moustakius
Ichthyophis multicolor
Ichthyophis nguyenorum
Ichthyophis nigroflavus
Ichthyophis nokrekensis
Ichthyophis orthoplicatus
Ichthyophis paucidentulus
Ichthyophis paucisulcus
Ichthyophis pauli
Ichthyophis pseudangularis
Ichthyophis sendenyu
Ichthyophis sikkimensis
Ichthyophis singaporensis
Ichthyophis sumatranus
Ichthyophis supachaii
Ichthyophis tricolor
Ichthyophis weberi
Ichthyophis youngorum
 Genus Uraeotyphlus
Uraeotyphlus gansi
Uraeotyphlus interruptus
Uraeotyphlus malabaricus
Uraeotyphlus menoni
Uraeotyphlus narayani
Uraeotyphlus oommeni
Uraeotyphlus oxyurus

References

Nussbaum, Ronald A. and Mark Wilkinson (1989). "On the Classification and Phylogeny of Caecilians." Herpetological Monographs, (3), 1-42

AmphibiaWeb: Information on amphibian biology and conservation. [web application]. 2004. Berkeley, California: AmphibiaWeb. Available: http://amphibiaweb.org/. Retrieved 26 August 2004

 
Amphibian families
Amphibians of Asia